Covarrubias is a village and municipality in the province of Burgos in the Spanish autonomous community of Castile and León.
It has 640 inhabitants, and it is near to Mecerreyes, Cubillo del Campo and Hortigüela.
Covarrubias is situated in the valley of the river Arlanza, which is extensively wooded with among other species Spanish Juniper.  Part of the area belonging to the municipality is included within a Special Protection Area for bird-life such as vultures.

The village itself was declared a Conjunto Histórico-Artístico, a type of conservation area, in 1965. Covarrubias and Tønsberg in Norway have entered a friendship agreement as the result of a medieval connection with Christina of Norway, Infanta of Castile.
A church honouring Saint Olaf II of Norway, designed by the architect Pablo López Aguado, has been built in the town and dedicated in 2011.

It was founded in the 7th century AD by the Visigothic king Chindasuinth.

One of the first areas to be reconquered from the Moors in the late ninth century, Covarrubias had an influence on Castile and its language.
The river is used for swimming and canoeing.  One feature, Fuente Azul ( Placed in the municipality of Hortigüela), is 6 km away.  It has a mild climate, and its cuisine includes black pudding, grapes (Arlanza (DO)), and cherries.

Places of interest
 the Torreón (a tower associated with Fernán González of Castile),
 the Gothic Colegiata (collegiate church) is a designated monument.  The building contains a historic organ and a museum with a painting attributed to Van Eyck.

Twin towns - sister cities

 Tønsberg, Norway. 
Covarrubias is twinned with Tønsberg. The link between these municipalities resides on Princess Christina of Norway, who travelled from Tønsberg to Spain in 1257 and was later buried in Covarrubias.

See also

Covarrubias (family name, lastname)
Camino del Cid

Notes

External links
Ayuntamiento de Covarrubias
Covarrubias webcam

Municipalities in the Province of Burgos